Willunga High School is a government high school in the town of Willunga, South Australia, located about  south of the Adelaide city centre.

Notable alumni
Jona Weinhofen, Josef "JJ" Peters and Michael Crafter formed the Adelaide band I Killed the Prom Queen in 2000. 
Weinhofen was subsequently associated with UK band Bring Me the Horizon and several other bands.
JJ Peters founded Deez Nuts.
Michael Crafter founded Confession and went on to star in big brother.

References 

Public schools in South Australia
High schools in South Australia